The Mickey Wright Invitational was a golf tournament on the LPGA Tour from 1961 to 1969. It was played at several different courses in the San Diego, California area. Tournament host and San Diego native, Mickey Wright, won the first three editions of the event and four in all.

Tournament locations

Winners
1969 Carol Mann
1968 Betsy Rawls
1967 Sandra Haynie
1966 Mickey Wright
1965 Kathy Whitworth
1964 Marlene Hagge
1963 Mickey Wright
1962 Mickey Wright
1961 Mickey Wright

References

Former LPGA Tour events
Golf in California
Sports competitions in San Diego County, California
Recurring sporting events established in 1961
Recurring sporting events disestablished in 1969
1961 establishments in California
1969 disestablishments in California
1960s in San Diego
Women's sports in California